Leonardo Patrasso (Alatri, 1230 – Lucca, 7 December 1311) was an Italian Franciscan and Cardinal.

He was a canon at Alatri, and from 1290 its bishop. He was bishop of Aversa from 1297 to 1299. His nephew, Pope Boniface VIII, made him a cardinal in the Consistory of 2 March 1300. Dean of the Sacred College of Cardinals, August 1309 until his death.

Notes

 

1230 births
1311 deaths
Italian Franciscans
Deans of the College of Cardinals
14th-century Italian cardinals
Cardinal-bishops of Albano
Cardinal-nephews
Bishops of Aversa